Tenhults IF, formed in 1912, is a Swedish football club located in Tenhult in Jönköping Municipality. In addition to football and floorball the club at one time also covered ice-hockey.

Background
Since their foundation Tenhults IF has participated mainly in the middle divisions of the Swedish football league system.  The club currently plays in Division 2 Västra Götaland which is the fourth tier of Swedish football. They play their home matches at the Kabevallen in Tenhult.

On 19 September 2006 Tenhults IF won the Smålandscupen (Småland Cup Competition) for the first time by defeating Nässjö FF 5–4 after extra time.

Tenhults IF are affiliated to the Smålands Fotbollförbund. Andreas Tegström formerly played for the club.

Season to season

Players

First-team squad

Management

Technical staff

Footnotes

External links
 Tenhults IF – Official website

Football clubs in Jönköping County
Association football clubs established in 1912
1912 establishments in Sweden